is a fictional character in Capcom's Street Fighter series. He made his first appearance in Street Fighter II: The World Warrior in 1991. He sometimes goes by the alias "long-arm" and his fighting ability includes stretching his limbs. In the series, he is a mystical yogi who is loved by his villagers and family alike. He is also a pacifist who goes against his beliefs by entering the World Warrior tournament to raise money for his poor village. Throughout the series, Dhalsim is a character centered on morality and he has been noted for his other unique qualities.

Appearances

In video games
In his Arcade Mode ending in Street Fighter II, Dhalsim wins the tournament and returns home on his elephant Kodal. Three years later, Dhalsim's son, Datta, discovers a photograph of his father from the tournament. From the original Street Fighter II and up until Super Street Fighter II, this ending graphic was drawn in a comical style. In Super Street Fighter II Turbo, it was changed to a more realistic style, with Dhalsim's wife Sally (named Sari in the UDON comic book series) added alongside Datta.

Dhalsim would later appear in the Street Fighter Alpha sub-series in Street Fighter Alpha 2 and Street Fighter Alpha 3. In his storyline in the Alpha games (which are set prior to the events of Street Fighter II), Dhalsim attempts to hunt down an "evil spirit" (M. Bison) that is threatening the world. Dhalsim also appears in the Street Fighter EX sub-series, beginning with the console-exclusive version, Street Fighter EX Plus α, followed by Street Fighter EX2 and Street Fighter EX3. His characterization and motivation are the same as they are in the previous Street Fighter game. Dhalsim later appears in Street Fighter IV, and has also appeared as a playable character in several crossover fighting games, which include: X-Men vs. Street Fighter, Marvel Super Heroes vs. Street Fighter, Marvel vs. Capcom 2, Capcom vs. SNK, Capcom vs. SNK 2, SNK vs. Capcom: SVC Chaos and Street Fighter X Tekken. He makes a special appearance in Street Fighter X Mega Man.

Character concept
The origin of Dhalsim's name was taken from an Indian restaurant in Osaka near Capcom's office ("Dhal" is lentils, "shim" is Hyacinth beans).

Before the official release of Street Fighter II, the early original design for Dhalsim was a turban-wearing fighter who had one of his abilities to double-jump in mid-air, and his name was Great Tiger (グレート・タイガー Hepburn: Gurēto Taigā?) who was most likely a copy of a fighter of the same name from the Punch-Out!! series since 1984. One of Dhalsim's other early designs bore a striking resemblance to Ganesha, a Hindu god with four arms and the head of an elephant. A picture of Ganesha can be seen in the background of his Street Fighter II stage, and his fifth alternate costume in Ultra Street Fighter IV resembles him.

Lead designer of Street Fighter II, Akira Nishitani, stated in an interview that the concept of Dhalsim's ability to stretch his limbs comes from the "Zoom Punch" technique featured in the manga series JoJo's Bizarre Adventure. This is reconfirmed in the comment section of Dhalism's bio in the Street Fighter X Tekken Artworks artbook. Fans would also point out that Dhalsim's stretching abilities were inspired by Wong Wing-song's role Yogi Tro Le Soung the Indian Fighter from the 1976 Taiwanese-Chinese wuxia film Master of the Flying Guillotine which was also a hit sequel.

Character design
Dhalsim is often depicted as having pupil-less eyes. His build is that of a normal man who exercises and weight trains regularly, except for the fact that his abdomen and waist appear out of proportion and emaciated. He wears torn saffron shorts as his only attire, along with matching wrist and ankle bands and a necklace of shrunken human skulls. He has three colored stripes adorning his head, and in the Street Fighter Alpha series, he wears a turban that he removes before battle. In Street Fighter V, Dhalsim appears much older, having grown a full beard, and now retains the turban on his head during battle.

His fighting style is a Yoga-based style, in which Dhalsim can stretch his arms, legs, abdomen and even his neck to great lengths making him a decent long-range hand-to-hand fighter. He also uses many fire-based attacks such as Yoga Fire, Yoga Flame and Yoga Blast, the latter being an anti-air technique. His super move in the Street Fighter EX, Cross Over and later Alpha Series was the Yoga Inferno, which was a multi-hitting flamethrower-style attack that could be directed manually.  Dhalsim also uses a teleportation technique known as the Yoga Teleport. In Street Fighter EX3, he gains a tag-team super move when paired with Blanka. In Street Fighter IV he uses the ultra combo move Yoga Catastrophe, as a large fireball which slowly moves toward and deals multi-damage on impact on any opponent, before using a super Yoga Inferno.

In other media
In Street Fighter II V, the UDON comic book series, and Street Fighter II: The Animated Movie, Dhalsim is a wise and powerful mystic who has mastered the inner mysteries of Yoga. In the comic, he helps prepare Sagat for his bout with Ryu and helps Ryu himself discover the darkness within his soul. Later on he is given an invitation to M. Bison's "Street Fighter II" global fighting tournament, wherein he defeats Adon in the preliminaries with ease.

In the anime series Street Fighter II V, Dhalsim is a monk who lives in a remote village in India. Sagat had earlier instructed Ryu to seek Dhalsim for advice about the Ways of Hadou. Sagat had been turned down years before when he sought Dhalsim's wisdom but figured that Ryu might be found more worthy. Dhalsim is a practitioner of yoga and has some psychic abilities, and although he knows much about Hadou, he was unable to train Ryu to use the Hadouken, which was inadvertently triggered in Ryu's body during a lesson. Dhalsim is voiced by Shōzō Iizuka in the Japanese version and Steve Blum in the English dub by Animaze/Manga Entertainment.

Dhalsim has a brief appearance in Street Fighter II: The Animated Movie, where he fights E. Honda in India. Though he gains the upper hand with his telekinetic abilities, he is distracted when he senses another nearby power, long enough for Honda to overpower him. He subsequently withdraws from the fight, giving Honda the victory, and apparently later points Ryu out to Honda, enabling him to give Ryu half the winnings out of gratitude.

Dhalsim also appears briefly in Street Fighter Alpha: The Animation as one of several fighters accompanying Ryu, Ken and Chun-Li to Professor Sadler's base to rescue Ryu's alleged younger brother, Shun. As the fighters demonstrate their skills to Sadler, Dhalsim fights Guy, avoiding Guy's attack by teleporting himself away to presumably strike Guy from behind. When Sadler's true intentions are revealed, Dhalsim and the other fighters are freed by Ken and Chun-Li.

Dhalsim is portrayed by British actor Roshan Seth in 1994's live action film Street Fighter. The film depicts Dhalsim as an Indian scientist and doctor whose science was originally supposed to promote peace, only for Bison to capture him and force him to aid him in his evil ambitions, one of which is the "supersoldier" experiment meant to turn Carlos Blanka into a mutated beast. During the process, Dhalsim alters Blanka's cerebral programming to keep him gentle and is found out by the lab guard. A fight ensues, in which Dhalsim is branded with the mutagen and almost killed, but Blanka is released and saves Dhalsim by killing the guard. When Guile arrives at the base, Dhalsim directs him to confront Bison. After Bison is defeated, Dhalsim decides to remain in Bison's base along with Blanka to await its destruction, choosing to atone for his part in mutating Blanka, telling Guile that "if good men do nothing, that is evil enough." In his final scenes, Dhalsim appears bald (having had a full head of hair earlier) with three rivulets of blood running down from the top of his head, as a nod to his appearance in the games.

Dhalsim is later featured in the Street Fighter animated series as part of Guile's team. From the original roster of Street Fighter II characters featured in the film, Dhalsim and T. Hawk are the only ones who do not appear as playable characters in the video game based on the film, Street Fighter. The opposite situation occurs with Akuma, who is a secret character in the game but does not appear in the film.

In the 1993 anime Ghost Sweeper Mikami, Episode 37 there is a background character that resembles Dhalsim and does the trademark Yoga Fire move.

Reception
In 1992, Dhalsim ranked at number five in the list of Best Characters of 1991 by the Gamest magazine in Japan. IGN ranked Dhalsim at number eight in their list of top Street Fighter characters, noting his unique gameplay and role as a "popular oddball". The Guardian ranked him as the 15th-top Street Fighter character in 2010, with writer Ryan Hart saying his ability to extend his limbs "changed the way you see fighting game characters". He additionally placed number fourteen on GameDaily's list of top Street Fighter characters of all time. He was also included in a list of the top 25 "baldies" by the same publication. In 2013, Complex placed Dhalsim third in a list of "12 Old School Video Game Characters Who Were Style Icons".

Topless Robot named him one of the "most ridiculously stereotyped" fighting game characters, calling him the most outlandish of Street Fighter IIs cast and drew comparisons to the Indian assassin in the film Master of the Flying Guillotine. The satirical book A Practical Guide to Racism, implicitly criticizes his portrayal as a sum of negative stereotypes of South Asians, where Hindus are portrayed as "nonviolent, magical, fastidious, stretchy, and pugnacious".

The book Game Design Perspectives notes Dhalsim as an example of a "nemesis character" in video games, one difficult to master proper usage of but widely considered one of the strongest characters in the game.

References

Action film characters
Capcom protagonists
Fictional characters who can stretch themselves
Fictional Hindus
Fictional Indian people in video games
Fictional monks
Fictional yogis
Male characters in video games
Street Fighter characters
Telepath characters in video games
Video game characters introduced in 1991
Video game characters who can teleport
Video game characters with fire or heat abilities
Fictional pacifists